"Good Grief" is a song by English indie pop band Bastille. It was released on 16 June 2016 as the lead single from their second studio album, Wild World (2016). The song was written by Dan Smith, who handled the production along with Mark Crew. It is their first single released to feature new touring member Charlie Barnes.

The song topped a 2020 NME poll of millennials for what song they would like to be played at their funeral ahead of Wiz Khalifa and Charlie Puth's song 'See You Again'.

Background
On 16 June 2016, Annie Mac debuted "Good Grief" on her BBC Radio 1 show as the "hottest track." Following the debut, the band released the single to radio and as a digital download.

Critical reception
Georgia Ivey of Clash said that the song was "surprisingly upbeat considering its reflection on the grieving process." Sarah Jamieson of DIY called the track a tone-appropriate album opener, saying that its "pomp and grandeur juxtaposed perfectly with Dan Smith’s dark-tinged tale of coping with life after death." NME writer Charlotte Gunn described it as "a euphoric pop track about death and funerals and being sad, but done Bastille-style, with a massive chorus and an X Factor-worthy key change." In his review of the album, Andy Baber of musicOMH felt the song was a "misleading introduction" to the record's various political themes, but said that it establishes the band's "move towards the more eclectic approach favoured on their mixtapes – as evidenced by the sampling of Kelly LeBrock from ‘80s movie Weird Science."

Music video
The video for "Good Grief" debuted on 22 June 2016. In addition to Smith's disembodied head, the video also features a burning house, a bank robbery, a running man, a teddy bear, rollerskating girls, a red car, a payphone, a game show, and scenes depicting nudity. A censored version was added, deleting or blurring some of the more offensive scenes. The clean version has gained over 8.5 million views as of June 2020. The original video has gained over 16 million views as of June 2020.

Track listing

Covers and remixes
The song has received covers by upcoming artists such as, Aaron Fleming, Chris Brenner, Connor Everitt, Felicia Lu, and Phoebe Whalley. Don Diablo and Autograf released official remixes for the song via iTunes, respectively on 8 July and 22 July 2016.

Charts

Weekly charts

Year-end charts

Certifications

Release history

References

2016 singles
2016 songs
Bastille (band) songs
Virgin Records singles
Songs written by Dan Smith (singer)
Songs about death